The 1900–01 St Helens R.F.C. season was the club's sixth in the Northern Rugby Football Union, the 27th in their history. In their lowest ever finish in a rugby league competition, coming only a year after their most fruitful one, the club finished 13th in the Lancashire Senior Championship, having two points docked for breach of professional rules in the process. In the Challenge Cup, the club were knocked out in the third round by Batley.

Lancashire Senior Championship

 St Helens had 2 points deducted for a breach of the professional rules.

References

St Helens R.F.C. seasons
1900 in English rugby league
1901 in English rugby league